is a 1948 Japanese drama film directed by Yasujirō Ozu, starring Kinuyo Tanaka and Shūji Sano.

Plot
The film is set in immediate postwar Japan, Tokyo.  Tokiko (Kinuyo Tanaka), a twenty-nine-year-old mother of a young boy of four, is waiting for her husband's repatriation from World War II.  In postwar Tokyo prices are escalating and the mother rents a room in a working-class industrial district, making ends meet through dressmaking.  She is supported by a long-time friend and former workmate Akiko (Chieko Murata).

One day, Tokiko's son little Hiroshi falls ill and needs to be hospitalized.  Although Hiroshi subsequently recovers, the high hospital bills force Tokiko to commit one desperate act: she decides to prostitute herself for a night at an out-of-the-way establishment.  When Akiko finds out about this she chides Tokiko for being stupid, and Tokiko begins to feel shame and folly even though she explains she has no other choice.

The husband, Shuichi Amamiya (Shūji Sano), finally returns from the war belatedly and the couple is blissfully reunited.  However, the conversation turns to Hiroshi's recent illness and Tokiko, finding it impossible to lie, comes clean with her husband over what she has done.  Shuichi flies into a rage and is totally unable to concentrate on his job for the next few days.  Thoughts about his wife's "misdeed" obsesses him and he finds out from her exactly where the establishment is.  Then he makes a secret visit to the place one afternoon, only to find another young, 21-year-old prostitute about to service him there.  From her he realizes that her resort to prostitution is out of desperation: her father is unable to work and her younger brother is in school.  Shuichi resolves to find for the girl a proper job at his workplace.

Shuichi confides his troubles to his colleague, Satake (Chishū Ryū).  Satake promises to do his best to help the girl, and advises Shuichi to forgive his wife.  But Shuichi states that he simply cannot help getting upset over Tokiko's act.  When he returns home, Tokiko tries desperately to placate him and apologizes repeatedly over her mistake, but Shuichi treats her brutally and violently, throwing her down a flight of stairs accidentally by force.  When he realizes she is hurt, he begins to get a grip over himself.  An injured Tokiko limps back up the room and tries further to reconcile with Shuichi, who confesses that he too is in the wrong.  They finally embrace each other desperately and promise to forget everything and start anew, relying on each other for their ultimate support.

Cast
 Kinuyo Tanaka as Tokiko Amamiya
 Shūji Sano as Shuichi Amamiya
 Chieko Murata as Akiko Ida
 Chishū Ryū as Kazuichiro Satake
 Hohi Aoki as Shoichi
 Chiyoko Ayatani as Fusako Onada
 Reiko Mizukami as Orie Noma
 Takeshi Sakamoto as Hikozo Sakai
 Eiko Takamatsu as Tsune

Release
In 2011 the BFI released a Region 2 DVD of the film as a bonus feature on its dual-format edition of An Autumn Afternoon.

References

External links

1948 films
1948 drama films
Japanese drama films
Japanese black-and-white films
1940s Japanese-language films
Films about prostitution in Japan
Films set in Tokyo
Films directed by Yasujirō Ozu
Films with screenplays by Yasujirō Ozu